The Stratemeyer Syndicate was a publishing company that  produced a number of mystery book series for children, including Nancy Drew, The Hardy Boys, the various Tom Swift series, the Bobbsey Twins, the Rover Boys, and others. They published and   contracted the many pseudonymous authors doing the writing of the series from 1899 through 1987, when the syndicate partners sold the company to Simon & Schuster.

History 
Created by Edward Stratemeyer, the Stratemeyer Syndicate was the first book packager to have its books aimed at children, rather than adults. The Syndicate was wildly successful; at one time it was believed that the overwhelming majority  of the books children read in the United States were Stratemeyer Syndicate books, based on a 1922 study of over 36,000 children country-wide.

Stratemeyer's business acumen was in realizing that there was a huge, untapped market for children's books. The Stratemeyer Syndicate specialized in producing books that were meant primarily to be entertaining. In Stratemeyer's view, it was the thrill of feeling grown-up and the desire for a series of stories that made such reading attractive to children. Stratemeyer believed that this desire could be harnessed for profit. He founded the Stratemeyer Syndicate to produce books in an efficient, assembly-line fashion and to write them in such a way as to maximize their popularity.

The first series that Stratemeyer created was The Rover Boys, published under the pseudonym Arthur M. Winfield. The Rover Boys books were a roaring success: A total of 30 volumes were published between 1899 and 1926, selling over five million copies. The Bobbsey Twins first appeared in 1904 under the pseudonym Laura Lee Hope, and Tom Swift in 1910 under the pseudonym Victor Appleton.

Stratemeyer published a number of books under his own name, but the books published under pseudonyms sold better. Stratemeyer realized that "he could offer more books each year if he dealt with several publishers and had the books published under a number of pseudonyms which he controlled." Stratemeyer explained his strategy to a publisher, writing that "[a] book brought out under another name would, I feel satisfied, do better than another Stratemeyer book. If this was brought out under my own name, the trade on new Stratemeyer books would simply be cut into four parts instead of three."

Some time in the first decade of the twentieth century Stratemeyer realized that he could no longer juggle multiple volumes of multiple series, and he began hiring ghostwriters, such as Mildred Benson, Josephine Lawrence, Howard R. Garis and Leslie McFarlane. Stratemeyer continued to write some books, while writing plot outlines for others.

While mystery elements were occasionally present in these early series, the Syndicate later specialized in children's mystery series. This trend began in 1911, when Stratemeyer wrote and published The Mansion of Mystery, under the pseudonym Chester K. Steele.  Five more books were published in that mystery series, the last in 1928. These books were aimed at a somewhat older audience than his previous series. After that, the Syndicate focused on mystery series aimed at its younger base: The Hardy Boys, which first appeared in 1927, ghostwritten by Leslie McFarlane and others; and Nancy Drew, which first appeared in 1930, ghostwritten by Mildred Wirt Benson, Walter Karig, and others. Both series were immediate financial successes.

In 1930, Stratemeyer died, and the Syndicate was inherited by his two daughters, Harriet Stratemeyer Adams and Edna Stratemeyer Squier. Stratemeyer Squier sold her share to her sister Harriet within a few years. Harriet Stratemeyer introduced such series as The Dana Girls (1934), Tom Swift Jr., The Happy Hollisters, and many others. In the 1950s, Harriet began substantially revising old volumes in The Hardy Boys and Nancy Drew series, updating them by removing references to outdated cultural elements, such as "roadster". Racial slurs and stereotypes were also removed, and in some cases (such as The Secret at Shadow Ranch and The Mystery at the Moss-Covered Mansion) entire plots were cast off and replaced with new ones. In part, these changes were motivated by a desire to make the books more up-to-date. Grosset & Dunlap, the primary publisher of Stratemeyer Syndicate books, requested that the books' racism be excised, a project that Adams felt was unnecessary. Grosset & Dunlap held firm; they had received an increasing number of letters from parents who were offended by the stereotypes present in the books, particularly in The Hardy Boys publications.

In the late 1970s, Adams decided it was time for Nancy and the Hardys to go into paperback, as the hardcover market was no longer what it had been. Grosset & Dunlap sued, citing "breach of contract, copyright infringement, and unfair competition". The ensuing case let the world know, for the first time, that the Syndicate existed; the Syndicate had always gone to great lengths to hide its existence from the public, and ghostwriters were contractually obliged never to reveal their authorship.

Grosset & Dunlap was awarded the rights to The Hardy Boys and Nancy Drew volumes that they had published, but the Syndicate was judged free to take subsequent volumes elsewhere. Subsequent volumes were published by Simon & Schuster.

Adams died in 1982. In 1987, Simon & Schuster purchased the syndicate from its partners — Edward Stratemeyer Adams, Camilla Adams McClave, Patricia Adams Harr, Nancy Axelrod and Lilo Wuenn — and turned to Mega-Books, a book packager, to handle the writing process for new volumes.

Writing guidelines

All Stratemeyer Syndicate books were written under certain guidelines, based on practices Stratemeyer began with his first series, the Rover Boys.

 All books would be part of a series.
 To establish more quickly if a series was likely to be successful, the first several volumes would be published at once. These first volumes are often called "breeders".
 The books would be written under a pseudonym. This would provide apparent continuity of authorship, even when an author died, and would disguise the fact that series were written by multiple ghostwriters and plot-outliners.
 The books would look as much like contemporary adult books as possible, with similar bindings and typefaces.
 The books would be of a predictable length.
 Chapters and pages should end mid-situation, to increase the reader's desire to keep reading.
 Each book would begin with a quick recap of all previous books in that series, in order to promote those books.
 Books might also end with a preview of the next volume in the series: "Nancy ... could not help but wonder when she might encounter as strange a mystery as the recent one. Such a case was to confront her soon, The Clue of the Whistling Bagpipes".
 The books would be priced at 50 cents, rather than the more common 75 cents, $1.00, or $1.25.
 Characters should not age or marry. Protagonists of early series such as the Rover Boys, Tom Swift, and Ruth Fielding did grow up and marry, but sales dropped afterwards, prompting the Syndicate to make a rule that characters never marry.

Criticism
For decades, libraries refused to carry any Syndicate books, considering them to be unworthy trash. Series books were considered to "cause 'mental laziness,' induce a 'fatal sluggishness,' and 'intellectual torpor. Series books were considered to ruin a child's chances for gaining an appreciation of good literature (which was subsequently shown by one study to not be the case), and to undermine respect for authority: "Much of the contempt for social conventions ... is due to the reading of this poisonous sort of fiction."

Franklin K. Mathiews, chief librarian for the Boy Scouts of America, wrote that series books were a method, according to the title of one of his articles, for "Blowing Out the Boys' Brains", and psychologist G. Stanley Hall articulated one of the most common concerns by asserting that series books would ruin girls in particular by giving them "false views of [life] ... which will cloud her life with discontent in the future."

None of this hurt sales and Stratemeyer was unperturbed, even when his books were banned from the Newark Public Library as early as 1901, writing to a publisher: "Personally it does not matter much to me. ... Taking them out of the Library has more than tripled the sales in Newark."

Foreign publications

Some syndicate series were also reprinted in foreign countries. An early foreign version was a Ted Scott Flying Stories book, published in Germany in 1930 as Ted Scott Der Ozeanflieger. The artwork was generally changed when reprinted in other countries, and sometimes character names and other details were as well. For example, in Norway, translations of the Nancy Drew books were first published in 1941, the first European market to introduce the girl detective. “The translators changed the color of Nancy's car, shortened the text, and made the language easier to read; but they made no substantive changes” to the stories. By the 1970s, Nancy Drew stories had “been translated into Spanish, Swedish, French, German, Dutch, Italian, Danish, Finnish, Norwegian, and Icelandic.

Other series reprinted outside the States include The Dana Girls, The Hardy Boys and the Bobbsey Twins (in Australia, France, Sweden, and the UK). These other series first appeared around the 1950s outside the United States.

The second Stratemeyer Syndicate series to be reprinted outside the United States appears to have been the first two books in the Don Sturdy series, although exact dates of printing are unknown.  Those were The Desert of Mystery and The Big Snake Hunters. There are two British versions known of the latter book; both were printed by The Children's Press, one in the 1930s and the second, with different cover art, in the 1950s.

See also
 List of Stratemeyer Syndicate series

Notes

References

 
 
 
 
 
 Klemesrud, Judy (4 April 1968). "100 Books - and Not a Hippie in Them." The New York Times, p. 52. Accessed through ProQuest Historical Newspapers on 22 May 2009.

External links

  Edward Stratemeyer & the Stratemeyer Syndicate – (c)2000 by James D. Keeline

Project Gutenberg ebooks online 
 Edward Stratemeyer
Victor Appleton; 
Richard Barnum;
Gerald Breckenridge;
Nicholas Carter;
Lester Chadwick;
Allen Chapman;
Alice B. Emerson; 
Howard Roger Garis;
Mabel C. Hawley;
Laura Lee Hope; 
Gertrude W. Morrison;
Margaret Penrose;
Homer Randall;
Roy Rockwood;
Frank V. Webster;
Arthur M. Winfield;
Mildred A. Wirt (Benson);
Clarence Young
Not found 2023 as Gutenberg authors: Franklin W. Dixon; Carolyn Keene; Eugene Martin

Archival collections 
 Stratemeyer Syndicate records at U. of Oregon (guide) at ArchivesWest
 Stratemeyer Syndicate records (guide) at New York Public Library 
 Stratemeyer Syndicate records (guide) at Archives at Yale 

 
Book packagers